In mathematics, in the field of algebraic topology, the Eilenberg–Moore spectral sequence addresses the calculation of the homology groups of a pullback over a fibration. The spectral sequence formulates the calculation from knowledge of the homology of the remaining spaces. Samuel Eilenberg and John C. Moore's original paper addresses this for singular homology.

Motivation
Let  be a field and let 
 and 
denote singular homology and singular cohomology with coefficients in k, respectively.

Consider the following pullback  of a continuous map p:

A frequent question is how the homology of the fiber product, relates to the homology of B, X and E. For example, if B is a point, then the pullback is just the usual product . In this case the Künneth formula says

However this relation is not true in more general situations. The Eilenberg−Moore spectral sequence is a device which allows the computation of the (co)homology of the fiber product in certain situations.

Statement
The Eilenberg−Moore spectral sequences generalizes the above isomorphism to the situation where p is a fibration of topological spaces and the base B is simply connected. Then there is a convergent spectral sequence with

This is a generalization insofar as the zeroeth Tor functor is just the tensor product and in the above special case the cohomology of the point B is just the coefficient field k (in degree 0).

Dually, we have the following homology spectral sequence:

Indications on the proof
The spectral sequence arises from the study of differential graded objects (chain complexes), not spaces. The following discusses the original homological construction of Eilenberg and Moore. The cohomology case is obtained in a similar manner.

Let 

structure maps

In down-to-earth terms, the map assigns to a singular chain s: Δn → B the composition of s and the diagonal inclusion B ⊂ B × B. Similarly, the maps  and  induce maps of differential graded coalgebras

, .

and similarly for E instead of X. It is now possible to construct the so-called cobar resolution for

as a differential graded  comodule. The cobar resolution is a standard technique in differential homological algebra:

where the n-th term  is given by

The maps  are given by

The cobar resolution is a bicomplex, one degree coming from the grading of the chain complexes S∗(−), the other one is the simplicial degree n. The total complex of the bicomplex is denoted .

The link of the above algebraic construction with the topological situation is as follows. Under the above assumptions, there is a map

that induces a quasi-isomorphism (i.e. inducing an isomorphism on homology groups)

where  is the cotensor product and Cotor (cotorsion) is the
derived functor for the cotensor product.

To calculate

,

view

as a double complex.

For any bicomplex there are two filtrations (see  or the spectral sequence of a filtered complex); in this case the Eilenberg−Moore spectral sequence results from filtering by increasing homological degree (by columns in the standard picture of a spectral sequence). This filtration yields

These results have been refined in various ways. For example,  refined the convergence results to include spaces for which

acts nilpotently on

for all 
and  further generalized this to include arbitrary pullbacks.

The original construction does not lend itself to computations with other homology theories since there is no reason to expect that such a process would work for a homology theory not derived from chain complexes.

References

Further reading 
 Allen Hatcher, Spectral Sequences in Algebraic Topology, Ch 3. Eilenberg–MacLane Spaces 

Spectral sequences
Homology theory